Norman Emilio Marcon  (born May 2, 1937) was a gastroenterologist at the Wellesley Hospital, St. Michael's Hospital, Unity Health Toronto and professor of medicine at the University of Toronto.

Marcon was one of the first gastroenterologists in Canada to use therapeutic endoscopy for the treatment of digestive diseases.

After receiving his MD at Queen's University in 1962, he continued his specialist training at University of Toronto St. Michael's Hospital in internal medicine, he specialized in Gastroenterology at The Harvard Medical Unit, Boston City Hospital. His further advanced medical training was at St Mark's Hospital. He began his practice at the Wellesley Hospital in Toronto where he served as the Division Head and Chief for 30 years.

He developed and directed the first training program in therapeutic endoscopy in Canada.  He developed one of the first courses in therapeutic endoscopy, with the top gastroenterologic faculty worldwide, to demonstrate, initially via satellite, live advanced cases in endoscopy for other gastroenterologists around the world. His research has included the application of optical coherence tomography to gastroenterology and therapies for dysplasia in Barrett's esophagus.

He was named as an officer of the Order of Canada in 2014. Marcon retired in 2020.

References

1937 births
Queen's University at Kingston alumni
Living people
Academic staff of the University of Toronto